Mixtaped is the first DVD release by British art rock group No-Man, consisting of a double DVD, with a live performance filmed at the London's Bush Hall on 29 August 2008, and a retrospective documentary titled Returning directed by award-winning journalist Richard Smith, amongst other features. The DVD takes its name from a song in Schoolyard Ghosts.

Track list

Disc one 
Disc one comprises a live performance of the band recorded at the sold-out show of the Bush Hall on 29 August 2008, one of the three first live concerts No-Man played in 15 years, plus a live photo gallery with photos from all three concerts, with an exclusive audio track of the song "Housekeeping" (recorded live in Düsseldorf).

 Only Rain
 Time Travel in Texas
 All Sweet Things
 Pretty Genius
 All the Blue Changes
 Truenorth
 Wherever There is Light
 Days in the Trees (version)
 Lighthouse
 Carolina Skeletons
 Returning Jesus
 Mixtaped
 Things Change
 Watching Over Me

Disc two 
The second disc consists of a retrospective documentary covering the entire band career including previously unseen footage, photos and images, and interviews with No-Man different live and studio members from past and present (including Tim Bowness, Steven Wilson, Ben Coleman and Chris Maitland). This DVD also features videos for the songs "Colours", "Sweetheart Raw", "The Ballet Beast" and "Back When You Were Beautiful", a No-Man chronology and deleted scenes.

Highlights From Mixtaped 
Initial pre-orders from the Burning Shed online store also received a bonus CD at no cost with some audio tracks of what are considered to be the best moments of the Bush Hall live show.
 Only rain / Time travel in Texas (9:39)
 All Sweet Things (6:42)
 Pretty Genius (3:48)
 Returning Jesus (4:49)
 Mixtaped (8:57)
 Things Change (8:19)

Line-up / Musicians 
 Tim Bowness / vocals
 Steven Wilson / guitar
 Stephen Bennett / keyboards
 Pete Morgan / bass guitar
 Michael Bearpark / guitar
 Steve Bingham / electric violin
 Andy Booker / electronic drums
 Ben Coleman / electric violin

External links 
 Mixtaped mini-site (This site appears to no longer exist. Checked 10 December 2021.)

References 

No-Man albums
Progressive rock video albums
2009 video albums
Live video albums
2009 live albums